John Cramer (known on camera as Cramer; born July 3, 1955) is an American television announcer.

Cramer did voiceover work for Game Show Network in 1996 and 1997.  He announced on The Newlywed Game and The Dating Game from 1997 to 1999.  In 2000, he announced on the short-lived 2000 revival of the game show Twenty One.  From 2001 to 2002, he announced on the NBC version of Weakest Link.  From 2002 to 2004, he was the announcer on the revival of Pyramid hosted by Donny Osmond. Cramer also did voiceovers for fake promos on Jimmy Kimmel Live!, and was the announcer for Fox News's The Half Hour News Hour. In 2011, he was one of the guest announcers for Wheel of Fortune and is a voiceover for We the People With Gloria Allred, along with the continuity and general announcing duties for nearly all the productions of Byron Allen's Entertainment Studios.

He also announced the 1992 CBS game show The Hollywood Game as well as Big Deal for Fox and a Food Network show called Trivia Unwrapped. John Cramer is also the announcer for Funny You Should Ask. He was also the announcer for the third season of Nickelodeon's game show BrainSurge, entitled Family Brainsurge and is also the announcer for the MTV Movie Awards and the MTV Video Music Awards.

References

External links
 

1955 births
Game show announcers
Living people
Place of birth missing (living people)